Tall Clubs International (TCI) is a social organization in the United States and Canada, comprising over fifty independent Tall Clubs.

The group says its mission is "to promote tall awareness among tall men and women, and in the community; to provide social activities of mutual interest, travel to cities around the U.S. and Canada for gatherings including members from several TCI clubs; run a convention each year to conduct the business of the Corporation with representatives of all clubs; and select a new Miss Tall International, the official public representative and good will ambassador for TCI."

In popular culture

The 2019 Netflix movie Tall Girl has a scene of parents hosting a meeting of the Tall group in their home for the benefit of their daughter, the titular tall girl.

See also
 Kae Sumner Einfeldt, Founder of the first tall club and inspiration for the affiliation
 Miss Tall International, TCI's designated spokesperson and ambassador, chosen annually by pageant
 Little People of America
 List of tallest people

References

External links
tall.org, Tall Clubs International Web site
 TCI index for Miss TI

TCI Affiliated Tall Club Web Sites
*Tall Club of Silicon Valley Founded 1980
California Tip Toppers Founded 1938
Kansas City Skyliners Founded 1939
Paramount Tall Club of Chicago Founded 1946
Golden Gate Tip Toppers Founded 1946
Tall Club of Toronto Founded 1948
Atlanta Sky-Hi Club Founded 1948
Portland Skyliners Founded 1957
Florida Skyliners of Miami / Tall Club of Miami Founded 1967
Central Arizona Tall Society (CATS) Founded 1979
Sacramento Tall Club Founded 1982
Tampa Bay Tall'n'Terrific Founded 1991
Atlantic Tall Club Founded 1996
Tall Club of the Palm Beaches Founded 1999

TimberLine Club of Denver Founded ???? (over 60 years ago)
Tall Club of Montreal Founded ????
Rocket City Tall Club Founded ????
Redwood Empire Tall Club Founded ????
San Diego Tall Club Founded 1974?
Diamond Valley Lake Tall Club Founded ????
Hartford Heights Tall Club Founded 199?
Sarasota Tall Sunsations Founded ????

European Federation of Tall Clubs Web Sites
(These clubs are friends of TCI but are not officially affiliated with TCI due to membership requirement differences.)
Tall Person's Club GB and Ireland Founded 1991

Tall Clubs International